David Smith Gordon (29 December 1882 – 1963) was a Scottish football player and manager. Gordon, who was born and raised in Leith, played for local side Leith Athletic while also working as a French polisher. He moved to England in 1905 to play for Hull City, for whom he made over 270 appearances in nine years. Gordon returned to Leith Athletic in 1914, before moving to Hibernian in 1916.

After Hibernian manager Dan McMichael died due to the effects of the flu pandemic, Gordon was appointed manager in February 1919. His time in charge of Hibernian was unsuccessful, but he signed some players who reached Scottish Cup finals in 1923 and 1924 under his successor, Alex Maley. Gordon resigned as Hibs manager in April 1921. After this he had short stints as a player with Kilmarnock, St Bernard's and Leith Athletic, before his playing retirement in 1922. Gordon later managed Hartlepools United and St Bernard's.

References

1882 births
1963 deaths
People from Leith
Footballers from Edinburgh
Scottish football managers
Scottish footballers
Hartlepool United F.C. managers
Hibernian F.C. managers
Hibernian F.C. players
Hull City A.F.C. players
Kilmarnock F.C. players
Leith Athletic F.C. players
St Bernard's F.C. managers
St Bernard's F.C. players
Scottish Football League managers
Scottish Football League players
English Football League managers
English Football League players
Association footballers not categorized by position